The Castle: Aik Umeed is a 2001 Pakistani television drama series, the third series made by Elysée Productions. It was scripted by Haseena Moin, produced by Tasmina Sheikh, and directed by Zulfiqar Sheikh. Actors Talat Hussain, Samina Ahmad, Shakeel, Shagufta Ejaz, Bilal Ahmad, Humayun Saeed, Asma Anwar, Nayyar Ejaz, Tasmina Sheikh, and Rehan Sheikh appeared. The Scottish politician Alex Salmond has a brief non-speaking cameo as a ghost at one point, and is listed in the credits for all 24 episodes.

Synopsis
Aik Umeed is an Urdu phrase meaning "a hope". The story dealt with Pakistani immigrants to Scotland, and was shot on location in Scotland and Pakistan. Wedderburn Castle was the location of much of the Scottish action.

Cast 
 Talat Hussain
 Samina Ahmad
 Shakeel
 Shagufta Ejaz
 Bilal Ahmad
 Humayun Saeed
 Asma Anwar
 Nayyar Ejaz
 Tasmina Sheikh
 Rehan Sheikh
 Alex Salmond

Broadcast
The program was broadcast by Pakistan Television Corporation.

References

Pakistani television series
Works set in castles